Joseph Arkin ( – ) was a mathematician, lecturer and professor at the West Point military academy.

Originally from Brooklyn, New York, Professor Joseph "Joe" Arkin was married for 48 years to Judith Lobel Arkin. They had four daughters, Helen, Aviva, Jessica and Sarah.

Professor Joseph Arkin worked at the Department of Mathematical Sciences at the United States Military Academy since 1986, until he retired from the faculty on September 23, 1994. He also spent time as a visiting lecturer at Princeton and The New York Academy of Sciences. He was a member of the American Mathematical Society since 1964, and member of the Fibonacci Association since 1965.

Most of his contributions and collaborative academic research was in the branch of number theory. He authored and co-authored publications, in collaboration with notable mathematicians like Paul Erdős, Ronald Graham, E.G. Straus, Richard Pollack, Vern Hoggatt, Paul Smith, V.E. Smith, Gerald Bergum, and Stefan Burr, among others.

Many of his studies have appeared in publications such as the Mathematics Magazine, Fibonacci Quarterly, SIAM Review, Duke Mathematical Journal, Journal of Recreational Mathematics, and in Notices of the American Mathematical Society.

Arkin also published papers in the Canadian Journal of Mathematics, the Pacific Journal of Mathematics, and the Mathematics and Computer Education Journal.

Academic research

References

20th-century American mathematicians
1923 births
2002 deaths
United States Military Academy faculty